The Latin Kings, abbreviated TLK, was a Swedish hip hop group from the municipality of Botkyrka in the southern suburbs of Stockholm, Sweden.

The members of the group are the lead rapper Dogge Doggelito (Douglas Léon) and the two brothers, Salla and Chepe. They all have roots in Latin America (Venezuela and Chile), which is why they took their name from the gang Latin Kings.

They grew up in the concrete suburbs in Botkyrka where a large proportion of the population are immigrants and refugees and the poverty is more visible than elsewhere in Sweden. The hip hop subculture has a large following in these areas of Stockholm. Their songs reflect life in the less affluent suburbs.

TLK were, in 1994, among the first to release a hip hop album with lyrics in Swedish (the first was Just D). Swedish rappers had before that time almost always used English. The debut album was Välkommen till förorten (Welcome to the suburb) and the very first single was "Snubben" (The dude). The group felt like they had been ripped off by their record company and decided to start their own label, Red Line Records, on which they have signed a number of hip hop artists in Sweden such as Fattaru, Kalle Kath, Fjärde världen and Ison & Fille.

If their contemporaries Infinite Mass were influenced by the West Coast sound, TLK has more of an East Coast flavor. The Latin Kings has become famous for rapping in the local Rinkeby Swedish, a "multiethnolect language" that is used in areas with many immigrants. This is a phonetically distinct form of Swedish, with loanwords from Turkish, Aramaic, Spanish, Finnish, Persian, Arabic and other languages.

Discography

Albums and singles 
Välkommen till förorten (Gold 50 000 sold) (1994)
"Snubben"
"Kompisar från förr"
"Mecka"
"Fint väder"
"Halva inne"
Bienvenido a mi barrio (1995) Spanish version of Välkommen till förorten
"Latino somos"
I skuggan av betongen (Platinum 102 000 sold) (1997)
"Botkyrka Stylee"
"Borta i tankar"
Mitt kvarter (Gold 83 000) (2000)
"De e knas"
"Blend dom"
"Ainaziz"
Omertà (2003)

Collections 
Familia Royal (2005)

See also
Swedish hip hop

Swedish hip hop groups
People from Alby, Botkyrka
Musical groups from Stockholm County
Musical groups disestablished in 2004
Musical groups established in 1994